Pulteney may refer to:

Places
 Pulteney, New York in the United States
 Pulteney, Wick in Scotland
 Pulteney Street in Adelaide, Australia

Other uses
Pulteney (surname)
Pulteney Grammar School in Adelaide, South Australia
Old Pulteney distillery in Wick, Caithness